Adam Cvijanovic (born 28 October 1960) is a painter based in New York City who was born in Cambridge, Massachusetts. He paints in large-scale format often using Tyvek sheeting as a substrate, which allows his work to be easily installed at multiple locations.  His work is concerned with exposing the historical and enduring hubris of American culture, painting forms that depict the search for and physical manifestation of American power and success on a monumental scale.  He is represented by Postmasters Gallery in New York.

Career
Though Cvijanovic is a self-taught artist, he has lectured widely and had exhibitions throughout many prominent galleries,.

He had a solo exhibition at UCLA Hammer Museum in 2005 and exhibited with Peter Garfield at MASS MoCA in 2007. His paintings have also been featured in exhibitions at P.S. 1 Contemporary Art Center in New York and the "USA Today" exhibition, curated from the collection of Charles Saatchi at the Royal Academy in London. "USA Today" traveled to the State Hermitage Museum, St. Petersburg, Russia.  In 2008 he had works exhibited at the New Orleans Biennial, the Walker Arts Center, and the Liverpool Biennial at the Tate Liverpool.

In 2013 he was commissioned to create the painting 10,000 Feet, a large scale mural of Indiana countryside at the Alexander Hotel in Indianapolis, Indiana.
Cvijanovic was married to the cabaret singer and psychic Peri Lyons from 1992 to 2007.

References

Further reading
 Inside the Artist's Studio, Princeton Architectural Press, 2015.

External links

 Adam Cvijanovic - Artist Page - Bellwether Gallery
 Adam Cvijanovic - Saatchi Gallery
 ArtForum review

1960 births
20th-century American painters
American male painters
21st-century American painters
Painters from Massachusetts
Columbia University alumni
Living people
Artists from Cambridge, Massachusetts
University of the Arts (Philadelphia) alumni
Painters from New York City
20th-century American male artists